The 2017 Players Championship was the 44th Players Championship, held May 11–14 at TPC Sawgrass in Ponte Vedra Beach, Florida, and the 36th edition held at the Stadium Course. 

Kim Si-woo, age 21, shot a final round 69 to win at 278 (−10), three strokes ahead of runners-up Louis Oosthuizen and Ian Poulter. Starting the final round two strokes back in fourth place, Kim became the championship's youngest winner by over 1½ years, passing Adam Scott (2004). 

In the preceding six months on the PGA Tour, Kim had missed the cut or withdrawn in most of his events and was without a top twenty finish. The win was his second on tour and moved him up 47 places in the world rankings, from 75 to 28.

In the final round, Rafa Cabrera-Bello recorded the first-ever double eagle at the par-5 16th hole, then birdied the par-3 17th. His tee shot on 18 hooked into the water, but he chipped in to save par and tied for fourth.

Defending champion Jason Day shot 80 on Sunday and was seventeen strokes back, tied for sixtieth place.

Venue

The course was shortened by  this year: #12 was reduced by 56 yards while two other holes were lengthened (#7 by 9 yards and #15 by 21 yards).

Course layout

Source:

Field
The field consisted of a minimum of 144 players meeting the following criteria:

1. Winners of PGA Tour events since last Players
Aaron Baddeley (3), Daniel Berger (3,10), Jonas Blixt (3), Wesley Bryan (10,12), Greg Chalmers, Kevin Chappell (3,10), Jason Day (3,5,6,8,9,10), Rickie Fowler (3,6,10,14), Sergio García (3,5,10), Cody Gribble, Adam Hadwin (3,10,14), Brian Harman (3), Russell Henley (3), Mackenzie Hughes, Billy Hurley III (3), Dustin Johnson (3,5,8,10,14), Kim Si-woo (3), Russell Knox (3,8,10), Marc Leishman (3,9,10), Hideki Matsuyama (3,8,10,14), William McGirt (3,9,10), Rory McIlroy (3,5,7,8,10), Ryan Moore (3,10), Rod Pampling, Pat Perez (4,14), D. A. Points, Jon Rahm (10,14), Patrick Reed (3,10), Cameron Smith, Jordan Spieth (3,5,7,10,14), Brendan Steele (3,14), Henrik Stenson (3,5,10), Hudson Swafford (3), Justin Thomas (3,10,14), Jhonattan Vegas (3), Jimmy Walker (3,5,10)

2. Winner of the 2016 Olympic Golf Tournament
Justin Rose (3,5,10,14)

3. Top 125 from previous season's FedEx Cup points list
Blayne Barber, Ricky Barnes, Zac Blair, Jason Bohn, Keegan Bradley, Scott Brown, Chad Campbell, Paul Casey (10), Roberto Castro, Alex Čejka, K. J. Choi, Ben Crane, Graham DeLaet, Luke Donald, Jason Dufner (5), Harris English, Derek Fathauer, Tony Finau, Jim Furyk, Robert Garrigus, Lucas Glover, Fabián Gómez, Branden Grace (10), Emiliano Grillo (10), Bill Haas (10), James Hahn, David Hearn, Jim Herman, Charley Hoffman (10), J. B. Holmes (10), Billy Horschel (7), Mark Hubbard, John Huh, Freddie Jacobson, Zach Johnson (5), Kang Sung-hoon, Smylie Kaufman, Jerry Kelly, Michael Kim, Chris Kirk, Kevin Kisner (10), Patton Kizzire, Brooks Koepka (10), Jason Kokrak, Matt Kuchar (6,10), Anirban Lahiri, Martin Laird, Danny Lee, Spencer Levin, David Lingmerth (9), Luke List, Andrew Loupe, Jamie Lovemark, Shane Lowry (8), Peter Malnati, Ben Martin, Graeme McDowell, Troy Merritt, Phil Mickelson (5,10), Bryce Molder, Francesco Molinari (10), Kevin Na, Noh Seung-yul, Sean O'Hair, Louis Oosthuizen (10), Ryan Palmer, Scott Piercy, Chez Reavie, Kyle Reifers, Patrick Rodgers, Charl Schwartzel (10), Adam Scott (5,8,10), Webb Simpson (5), Vijay Singh, Kyle Stanley, Shawn Stefani, Brett Stegmaier, Robert Streb, Kevin Streelman, Steve Stricker, Brian Stuard, Daniel Summerhays, Vaughn Taylor, Cameron Tringale, Tyrone van Aswegen, Harold Varner III, Johnson Wagner, Bubba Watson (5,8,10), Boo Weekley, Danny Willett (5,10), Gary Woodland (10)
Jon Curran, Charles Howell III, Colt Knost, John Senden, Brandt Snedeker (10), and David Toms did not play.

4. Top 125 (medical)
Patrick Cantlay, Brian Gay, Ian Poulter

5. Major champions from the past five years
Ernie Els, Martin Kaymer (6,10)

6. Players Championship winners from the past five years
Tiger Woods did not play.

7. The Tour Championship winners from the past three years

8. World Golf Championship winners from the past three years

9. Memorial Tournament and Arnold Palmer Invitational winners since 2015 
Matt Every

10. Top 50 from the Official World Golf Ranking
Rafa Cabrera-Bello, Ross Fisher, Matt Fitzpatrick, Tommy Fleetwood, Tyrrell Hatton, Yuta Ikeda, Alex Norén, Lee Westwood, Bernd Wiesberger
Thomas Pieters did not play.

11. Senior Players champion from prior year
Bernhard Langer

12. Web.com Tour money leader from prior season

13. Money leader during the Web.com Tour Finals
Grayson Murray

14. Top 10 current year FedEx Cup points leaders

15. Remaining positions and alternates filled through current year FedEx Cup standings

Nationalities in the field

Round summaries

First round
Thursday, May 11, 2017

William McGirt and Mackenzie Hughes shared the lead after both shot 67. Masters champion Sergio García made a hole-in-one on the 17th hole after recovering from a poor start for a round of 73.

Second round
Friday, May 12, 2017

Third round
Saturday, May 13, 2017

Under PGA Tour rules, when more than 78 players make the 36-hole cut, a 54-hole cut is employed to reduce the field to the top 70 and ties. This second cut reduced the field from 82 to 71, which included 2012 champion Matt Kuchar, who fell to 82nd at 225 (+9) after an 81.

Final round
Sunday, May 14, 2017

Scorecard
Final round

Cumulative tournament scores, relative to par

Source:

References

External links

2017
2017 in golf
2017 in American sports
2017 in sports in Florida
May 2017 sports events in the United States